Parsons Dance is a contemporary dance company founded by choreographer David Parsons. The company tours nationally and internationally, and includes an annual season in New York. Based in New York City, Parsons Dance was founded in 1987, by David Parsons and lighting designer Howell Binkley.

History
Parsons Dance was founded July 17, 1985, by David Parsons and Howell Binkley. 

The company consists of nine full-time dancers. It maintains a repertory of more than 80 works, twenty of which feature commissioned original scores by composers and musicians including Dave Matthews, Michael Gordon, Milton Nascimento, John Mackey, and Phil Woods. Parsons Dance has collaborated with many other artists, including Julie Taymor, William Ivey Long, Annie Leibovitz, Donna Karan and Alex Katz.

As of 2021 Parson was Artistic Director and Choreographer. The company performs in the Joyce Theater.

Reception 
According to The New York Times the company is known for "works that forgo intellectual rigor for old-fashioned fun".

Notable people 

 Robert Battle
 Howell Binkley
 Roger Montoya
 Katarzyna Skarpetowska (1999-2006)

References

Dance companies in New York City
Contemporary dance companies
1985 establishments in New York City
Arts organizations established in 1985